Chennaiyin Football Club is an Indian professional football club based in Chennai, Tamil Nadu. The club competes in the Indian Super League, the top flight of Indian football. The club was founded in August 2014 during the inaugural season of the Indian Super League. One of the most successful clubs in the history of the league, it has won the Indian Super League title on two occasions, in the 2015,2017–18,seasons respectively.

The club is owned by  Vita Dani, Bollywood actor Abhishek Bachchan and  Indian cricketer MS Dhoni. The team's name Chennaiyin FC means Chennai's football club in Tamil where the 'yin' suffix is similar to a possessive 's' in English. The club's primary colour is blue ever since its inception and its logo is the Dhrishti Bommai, a representation of chasing away negativity and preserving positivity in the Tamil culture.

History

Origin
When the Indian Super League was founded in 2014, the city of Chennai was one of the nine proposed cities up for franchise bidding. However, on 11 April 2014 it was reported that Chennai's main bidder, a consortium led by Sunil Gavaskar would drop out due to commitments with the Board of Control for Cricket in India. In August 2014, with two months before the 2014 ISL season, the Bangalore owners Sun Group dropped out due to disputes with the organizers. Initially reports came out that the ISL organizers were looking for bidders for new owners for the Bangalore franchise before it was revealed that Ronnie Screwvala  and actor Abhishek Bachchan would together bid for a Chennai team instead of a Bangalore franchise.

Foundation
On 14 August 2014, it was reported that ISL officials were inspecting the Jawaharlal Nehru Stadium in Chennai for the proposed team. Finally, the team was bid for by actor Abhishek Bachchan and Vita Dani. On 12 September 2014, Italian World Cup winner Marco Materazzi was hired as player-manager. On 6 October 2014, former Indian cricket captain Mahendra Singh Dhoni became the joint co-owner of the club. The club officially launched their jersey on 9 October 2014 but had changed their home jersey's pattern in the 2018–19 Indian Super League season.

Marco Materazzi era (2014–2016)

On 15 October 2014, Chennaiyin won their first Indian Super League fixture with a 2–1 victory over FC Goa. The goals were scored by Balwant Singh, who became the first Indian player to score in the competition, and the former Brazil international Elano. On 28 November 2014, the club brought Alessandro Nesta, who won the World Cup for Italy out of retirement. The team finished its 14-game regular season in first place in the league. In the semi finals, the team lost the first leg 3–0 to Kerala Blasters FC. In the second leg, they overturned the deficit by leading 3–0 in regular time. However, a 117th-minute goal by Stephen Pearson sent Kerala through to the finals.

For the second season of Indian Super League, they retained six players: Balwant Singh, Jayesh Rane, Dhanachandra Singh, Jeje Lalpekhlua, Harmanjot Khabra and Abhishek Das. They also signed Godwin Franco and Mehrajuddin Wadoo. On the last day of the transfer window, Chennaiyin FC announced that they had signed back Stiven Mendoza. The season started with the team losing the first two games. Though the team managed to score points by winning at Goa and Mumbai, they lost another three games on the trot. By the third week of November, Chennaiyin were placed last in the league table. However, the team won four consecutive games to qualify for the playoffs, finishing at 3rd place in the regular season. They won the second season of the ISL by beating FC Goa 3–2 in the finals.

For the third season, of Indian Super League, they retained six players: Mehrajuddin Wadoo, Jayesh Rane, Dhanachandra Singh, Jeje Lalpekhlua, Harmanjot Khabra, Thoi Singh and Abhishek Das. Chennai signed John Arne Riise as the marquee player for the season. The season kicked off with a draw against Kolkata. Winning only three games through the season, the team finished in seventh place, just one point more than the last placed FC Goa. After a dismal season, it was announced on 6 March that Marco Materazzi and Chennaiyin parted ways on mutual consent.

John Gregory era (2017–2019)

On 3 July 2017, the club announced the appointment of former Aston Villa Manager John Gregory as the head coach for the 2017–18 season. He took charge in September and the club traveled to Thailand for pre-season. Chennaiyin lost Gregory's first league game as head coach on 19 November against FC Goa. The team won its next three matches against Northeast United FC, FC Pune City and ATK. Mumbai City FC brought Chennaiyin FC's winning run to an end with a battling 1–0 win at home inside the Mumbai Football Arena. The blues then travelled to Sree Kanteerava Stadium, where they beat Bengaluru FC 2–1 in a tightly contested match. Chennaiyin FC were held to a 1–1 draw when they faced Kerala Blasters at home in their next game. In spite of the draw, The Blues went top of the table with 13 points after seven games. The team went on to win the finals against Bangalore on their home ground and became the champions for the second time. Chennaiyin FC finished as runner-ups in AIFF Super Cup 2019 where they lost to FC Goa 2–1. Following Indian Super League glory in 2017–18, Chennaiyin became the first Indian club, representing the ISL, to play in the AFC Cup, as they drew 0–0 with Colombo FC in Sri Lanka on 6 March 2019. A week later, they won the second leg 1–0 in Chennai to progress to the 2019 AFC Cup group stage. Chennayin FC is the first ISL club to reach in Group stage of AFC Cup 2019 i.e. in Group E. They played a tie of 0–0 to Minerva Punjab FC on 3 April 2019 and won 2–0 to Nepalese club Manang Marshyangdi Club on 17 April 2019 whereby Maílson Alves and Chris Herd were also accompanied by win against Abahani Limited Dhaka by 1–0 and goal scorer was Anirudh Thapa on 30 April 2019. On 19 June 2019 Chennaiyin FC faced a draw of 1–1 against Minerva Punjab F.C. where Mohammed Rafi secured a goal in the last minute of game. On John Gregory's 65th birthday the club announced that the coach's contract was renewed which will expire soon after the 2019–20 Indian Super League season. After losing the AFC Cup the club then made some shocking decisions by releasing their captain, Mailson Alves and Raphael Augusto as a preparation for the 2019–20 Indian Super League season. They also released some of the Indian players in their team which includes C.K. Vineeth, Mohammed Rafi, Halicharan Narzary, Isaac Vanmalsawma. They then signed Nerijus Valskis, Lucian Goian, Dragoș Firțulescu, André Schembri, Masih Saighani and Rafael Crivellaro to strengthen their squad. On 30 November 2019 John Gregory resigned from his post as head coach even though owner Mrs. Vita Dani tried in vain to get him to stay. Under his guidance Chennai won their second Indian Super League trophy.

Owen Coyle (2019–2020)

Owen took the charge of the club on 4 December 2019. Under his guidance Chennaiyin faced 1–1 draw against Jamshedpur, won 3–1 against Kerala Blasters and lost a dramatic game 4–3 to Goa in the initial days of Coyle. They lost to Odisha on 6 January 2020 and won a game against Hyderabad by 3–1.

The Coyle era catapulted Chennaiyin FC to 4th from Bottom of the table (9th), thus earning them qualification for the playoffs. He went on to guide Chennaiyin FC to the 2020 ISL final after beating FC Goa 6–5 on aggregate over the two legs of the semifinals.

Chennaiyin were beaten 3–1 by ATK with the game played behind closed doors, due to the rise of the COVID-19 pandemic in India. Nerijus Valskis, who scored in the final for Chennaiyin, topped golden boot tally consequently, he was awarded ISL golden boot.

Csaba László (2020–2021)
Csaba László took the charge of the club on 30 August 2020. He had an average season with three wins and 11 draws. On April 10, 2021, he parted ways with the club.

Božidar Bandović (2021–2022) 
Chennaiyin FC appointed Bozidar Bandovic as their manager for the 2021–22 season following the 0–5 defeat to FC Goa - the heaviest loss endured by the club in its history, the club said in a statemen. "Bandovic was in charge of the first team for 16 matches - winning five, drawing four and losing seven. The team's assistant coach Syed Sabir Pasha will take over in the interim. Over the years, we've lost and won. But as a club, losing like this is something we cannot stand by and watch. And for now, we have full confidence in Sabir to see the season through," co-owner Vita Dani stated.

Stadium 

 
Chennaiyin FC play their home matches at the Jawaharlal Nehru Stadium in Chennai nicknamed the Marina Arena. The stadium is located at Sydenhams Road, Park Town behind the Chennai Central suburban Railway station and Ripon Building. The stadium is named after Jawaharlal Nehru, India's first Prime Minister and earlier hosted cricket Test Matches between 1956 and 1965.

Support

Chennaiyin has a considerable fan base with an average attendance of over 20,000 over the first three seasons.

Chennaiyin FC is one of the very few clubs in India to have multiple active fan groups. The B Stand Blues (BSB) and the Supermachans are the two fan groups of Chennaiyin FC. Both the fan groups are very famous among the Indian football scenario and they are constantly active on and off the season. Their support to the team is so dedicated and they also carry out CSR activities.

Both these fan groups have worked so hard to spread the football fan culture in the state.
They even travel to some away games to extend their support to the club.
The most famous away trip is the 2017-18 ISL finals against Bengaluru FC, where there were hundreds of fans from both fan clubs despite the game happening in a different state. Both fan clubs ended up conquering the stands of Kanteerava when their club had conquered it on the field.

Opponents generally find the Chennaiyin crowd intimidating. Indian captain Sunil Chhetri himself has acknowledged this fact, as he's usually been on the receiving end when he travels to the Marina Arena in BFC colours.
In addition to this, Chennaiyin also has a huge fan following all over the state of Tamil Nadu. Their social media following is among the top in Indian clubs.

Rivalry

Since both Chennaiyin FC and Kerala Blasters FC are two dominant clubs from South India, the rivalry between these two clubs' fans is visible both on ground and on various social platforms. The matches between both the clubs create sparks among both the clubs and especially the fans. The meetings between the two teams are known as the Southern Derby.

Kit manufacturers and shirt sponsors

Players

First-team squad

Out on loan

Personnel

Current Technical Staff

Medical

Management

Board of directors

Top goalscorers
Here is the list of top goalscorers across all competitions.

In Bold: Players currently playing for Chennaiyin FC

Honours

League 

Indian Super League
Champions (2): 2015, 2017–18
Runners-up (1): 2019–20

Cup 
Super Cup
Runners-up (1): 2019
Stafford Challenge Cup
Runners-up (1): 2023 (Reserves)

AFC Club ranking

Continental record

eSports
The organizers of ISL introduced eISL, a FIFA video game tournament, for the ISL playing clubs, each represented by two players. Chennaiyin FC hosted a series of qualifying games for all the participants wanting to represent the club in eISL. On 20 November the club announced the signing of the two players. They won the inaugural eISL on 20 March 2022, following 2022 Indian Super League Final

Roster

See also
 List of football clubs in India
 Sport in Chennai

References

External links 

Chennaiyin FC at the-aiff.com
 Chennaiyin FC at Global Sports Archive

 
Sport in Chennai
Football clubs in Chennai
Indian Super League teams
2014 establishments in Tamil Nadu
Association football clubs established in 2014